Abbie Marie Boudreau (born April 14, 1978) is currently the CEO and founder of SOCKABU, a specialty sock company. Abbie is a 20- year TV broadcast veteran. She is a three time National Emmy Award winning journalist and a Gracie Award winner for her collaborative work on ABC News' Good Morning America.

Early career
Abbie grew up in Bourbonnais, Illinois and attended Bradley Bourbonnais Community High School before attending Loyola University in Chicago earning her bachelor's and a master's degree in broadcast journalism from Northwestern University. Prior to joining CNN Boudreau worked at KWWL-TV in Waterloo, Iowa, WWMT-TV in Kalamazoo, MI, and KNXV-TV in Phoenix, AZ.

Abbie Boudreau was an ABC News correspondent based in the network's Los Angeles bureau. She reported for all broadcasts and platforms, including "World News with Diane Sawyer", "Nightline", and "Good Morning America", as well as ABC Now and ABCNews.com. Prior to joining ABC news, Boudreau was an investigative correspondent with CNN. Her work there earned her two national Emmy nominations, a National Headliner Award, a national Clarion Award and the Livingston Award for international reporting. She was also an IRE finalist for an investigative series, "Hurricane Giveaway", which revealed that millions of dollars in supplies intended for the victims of Hurricane Katrina were given away to other government agencies, including prisons. Throughout her career, Boudreau's investigations repeatedly led to significant action. As the United States Postal Service was facing financial issues in 2009, Boudreau exposed the agency's practice of buying million dollar homes to relocate its employees, a policy that changed after the investigation aired. One month after her investigation into the controversial 96-hour rule, which required NATO soldiers to release suspects or turn them over to Afghan authorities after 96 hours, the U.S. Department of Defense announced it was doing away with the rule and putting a new policy in place. Before joining CNN in 2007, Boudreau worked as an Investigative reporter at ABC's Phoenix affiliate KNXV-TV, where she received numerous awards for her work, including regional Edward R. Murrow awards for investigative reporting in both 2006 and 2007.She has received seven regional Emmy Awards for investigative reporting and writing and enterprise journalism and two national Emmy Award nominations for investigative reporting. In addition, she has been honored with multiple Arizona AP Broadcasters Association Awards for investigative news and enterprise news, the First Amendment Award through the Society of Professional Journalists and the Television Award from the American College of Emergency Physicians. Boudreau has also worked for WWMT-TV in Kalamazoo, MI., and began her career at KWWL-TV in Waterloo, IA.

References

American investigative journalists
Living people
Place of birth missing (living people)
CNN people
1978 births
People from Kankakee, Illinois
People from Bourbonnais, Illinois
ABC News personalities
Livingston Award winners for International Reporting